Sabrina Massialas (born January 22, 1997) is an American fencer. She qualified to represent Team USA in the 2020 Tokyo Summer Olympics, competing as part of the Women's Foil Team, which ranked 4th.

Massialas was the first U.S. fencer ever to win a Youth Olympic Games gold medal in 2014. She also fenced at Notre Dame, where she was a two-time ACC champion (2016, 2017) and a four-time NCAA All-American (2016–2019).

References

External links
 
 Sabrina Massialas at USA Fencing

1997 births
Living people
American female foil fencers
Olympic fencers of the United States
Fencers at the 2020 Summer Olympics
Notre Dame Fighting Irish fencers
Fencers from San Francisco
Fencers at the 2014 Summer Youth Olympics
Youth Olympic gold medalists for the United States
21st-century American women